Ilemodes heterogyna, the broad buttered footman, is a moth of the family Erebidae. The species was first described by George Hampson in 1900. It is found in Malawi, South Africa, Uganda, Ethiopia and Kenya.

The larvae feed on lichens.

Subspecies
Ilemodes heterogyna heterogyna
Ilemodes heterogyna astrigoides Rothschild, 1933 (Ethiopia, Kenya)

References

Arctiini
Moths described in 1900
Erebid moths of Africa